Qalat-e Khvar (also Romanized as Qalāt-e Khvār and Qalātkhvār; also known as Ghalatkhar) is a village in Aliabad-e Malek Rural District, in the Central District of Arsanjan County, Fars Province, Iran. At the 2006 census, its population was 466, in 119 families.

References 

Populated places in Arsanjan County